Walter Licht (born July 15, 1946) is an American historian who specializes in labor history, economic history, and the history of American capitalism.  He is Walter H. Annenberg Professor of History Emeritus at the University of Pennsylvania.

Life and career 
Licht earned his B.A. at Harvard University and an M.A. in Sociology at the University of Chicago before moving to Princeton University where he completed an M.A. and Ph.D in History.

He has taught at the University of Pennsylvania since 1977, and is also the faculty director of the Civic House and the Penn Civic Scholars Program.

Works 
 American Capitalisms: The U.S. Economy in Historic World Perspective. (Princeton University Press, forthcoming)
 The Face of Decline: The Pennsylvania Anthracite Region in the Twentieth Century (Cornell University Press, 2005) . 
 Getting Work: Philadelphia, 1840–1950 (University of Pennsylvania Press, 1992/2000) .
 Industrializing America: The Nineteenth Century (Johns Hopkins University Press, 1995) . 
 Work Sights: Industrial Philadelphia, 1890-1950 (Temple University Press, 1986) . 
 Working For The Railroad: The Organization of Work in the Nineteenth Century (Princeton University Press, 1983/2014) .

References

Living people
1946 births
People from Brooklyn
Harvard University alumni
University of Pennsylvania faculty
University of Pennsylvania historian
Walter H. Annenberg Professor
University of Chicago alumni
21st-century American historians
21st-century American male writers
Princeton University alumni
Historians from New York (state)
American male non-fiction writers